Jens Christian Christensen (21 November 1856 – 19 December 1930), most often called J. C. Christensen with the 'J' pronounced as an 'I', was a Danish politician.

Biography
Christensen was born into a West Jutland peasant family and starting as a herd boy, he was educated a teacher and joined politics at an early age. He was a member of the Danish Liberal Party until he founded the Venstre Reform Party in 1895. During later years, he successfully and adroitly led the opposition against the last Right cabinets, which resulted in the victory of parliamentarianism 1901. In the first Left cabinet of J. H. Deuntzer, Christensen was Minister of Cultus and the strongman of the government, introducing reforms in the village school system.

J. C. Christensen was Council President of Denmark from 1905 to 1908 as the leader of the Christensen I Cabinet and II. During this period he introduced female suffrage in local politics and tried to solve the problem of the defense. Also, he took the first steps towards a re-conciliation with the moderate liberals excluding the radicals. In addition, a law was passed in April 1907 that authorised state contributions for unemployment relief.

The Alberti scandal in 1908 led to his fall and weakened his position, but he was still the leader of his party participating in the second Carl Theodor Zahle cabinet 1916–1918. In 1920–1922, he was minister for the last time and two years later he left politics. During his last years he supported the cultivation of the moor of Jutland.

Literature
Dansk Biografisk Leksikon, vol. 3, Copenhagen, 1979.
 Svend Thorsen: De danske ministerier, vol. 1, Copenhagen, 1967.
 https://books.google.co.uk/books?id=YCM5AQAAMAAJ&pg=PA215&lpg=PA215&dq=denmark+unemployment+insurance+1907&source=bl&ots=UUX7gQc0n_&sig=6NzHgyS-QwUib3I8QTxX0bmbBiQ&hl=en&sa=X&ved=0CDcQ6AEwBWoVChMIuY3mhb_FyAIVRLcUCh3pawwA#v=onepage&q=denmark%20unemployment%20insurance%201907&f=false

1856 births
1930 deaths
Danish Defence Ministers
Danish Kultus Ministers
Prime Ministers of Denmark
Speakers of the Folketing
Danish Ministers for Ecclesiastical Affairs
Honorary Knights Grand Cross of the Order of St Michael and St George
19th-century Danish politicians
20th-century Danish politicians
Leaders of political parties in Denmark